Freefall is a BBC television film written and directed by Dominic Savage, that premiered on BBC Two on 14 July 2009.

Set in autumn 2007, Freefall is a dramatic satire of the mortgage crisis that led to the worldwide economic downturn. Dominic Cooper stars as Dave Matthews, a charismatic corporate psychopath who sells mortgages in Watford, Hertfordshire, to families denied credit whether they can afford repayment or not. In the series, Dave meets up with an old school mate, Jim Potter (played by Joseph Mawle) who becomes another of Dave's mortgage victims. Despite a confrontation from Jim, Dave feels nothing and moves on to sell expensive solar panel packages to upper-middle-class house wives. Aidan Gillen stars as Gus, a high flying workaholic who sells corporate mortgages.

This film highlights the delusional atmosphere of all walks of life prior to the economic collapse, from the naive working-class Jim to the high-flying workaholic Gus. Even Dave believes his own unfounded salesman spiel, crippling himself with a colossal £800,000 mortgage he quickly has to dispose of to "some rich mug". The film portrays the varying degrees of the collapse's effect on the different types of people involved, with Dave simply moving on to a different job compared to a complete breakdown and tragic end for Gus (shockingly the case for some bankers of the time).

A critic noted that the series' take on the credit crunch by writer and director Savage had heartfelt approach, but was hurt with the lack of subtlety.

Cast
Dominic Cooper – Dave Matthews
Aidan Gillen – Gus
Joseph Mawle – Jim Potter
Riz Ahmed – Gary
Alfie Allen – Ian
Anna Maxwell Martin – Mandy
Rosamund Pike – Anna

References

External links
 
 

BBC television dramas
2009 television films
2009 films
British television films